The Hit Man  is the sixth album by former Temptations  vocalist Eddie Kendricks.  The album was released in 1975 on the Tamla imprint of Motown Records.

Reception

Track listing
"If Anyone Can" - (Kathy Wakefield, Leonard Caston)  3:22 
"Happy" - (Kathy Wakefield, Leonard Caston)  5:13 
"Get the Cream Off the Top" - (Brian Holland, Eddie Holland)  3:04
"Body Talk" - (Frank Wilson, Kathy Wakefield)  6:41 
"Fortune Teller" - (Barrett Strong)  3:32
"Skippin' Work Today" - (J. Christopher Fox)  4:35
"You Loved Me Then" - (Kathy Wakefield, Leonard Caston)  2:30
"I've Got to Be" - (Kathy Wakefield, Leonard Caston)  7:48

Personnel
Eddie Kendricks - lead and backing vocals
James Jamerson - bass
Harold Johnson, Leonard Caston Jr. - keyboards
Earl Palmer, Ed Greene, Harvey Mason, James Gadson - drums
Jay Graydon, Johnny McGhee, Melvin "Wah-Wah" Ragin, Ray Parker Jr. - guitar
Bobbye Hall, Gary Coleman, Gene Estes - percussion
Eddie "Bongo" Brown - congas
Bobby Taylor, Carolyn Majors, Frank Wilson, Harold Johnson, Joe Croyle, Joe White, John Fox, Karin Patterson, Leonard Caston Jr., Mara Baygulow, Mike Campbell - vocal ensemble
Jim Britt - cover photography

Charts

Singles

References

External links
 Eddie Kendricks-The Hit Man at Discogs

1975 albums
Eddie Kendricks albums
Tamla Records albums
Albums produced by Frank Wilson (musician)
Albums produced by Brian Holland